Tongshan may refer to the following locations in China:

 Tongshan County, Xianning, Hubei
 Tongshan District (formerly Tongshan County), Xuzhou, Jiangsu

 Township-level units
 Tongshan Subdistrict, Tongshan District, Xuzhou, Jiangsu
 Tongshan, Anhui, a town in Jiaoqu, Tongling
 Tongshan, Zhejiang, a town in Zhuji
 Tongshan Township, Biyang County, Henan
 Tongshan, Dongkou, a township of Dongkou County, Hunan

See also
 Dongshan County, formerly Tongshan
 Tangshan